Number 8 is a community arts centre in the English town of Pershore. It includes a 250-seat auditorium used for music, theatre and cinema events, a small dance and rehearsal space, conference facilities, a gallery, café and bar. It opened in 2004 in a renovated 18th-century building at 8 High Street.
Number 8 is also the home of the local arts group PODS (The Pershore Operatic and Dramatic Society), and more recently PODYS (Pershore Operatic and Dramatic Youth Society), who regularly perform there.

External links
Number8.org - official website
Advantage West Midlands press release

Buildings and structures in Worcestershire
Arts centres in England
Tourist attractions in Worcestershire
Pershore